Orlando Brandes (born 13 April 1946) is a Brazilian prelate of the Catholic Church who has served as the Archbishop of Aparecida since 2017. He was Bishop of Joinville from 1994 to 2006 and Archbishop of Londrina from 2006 to 2016.

Early life
Brandes was born on 13 April 1946 in Urubici, Brazil. He completed his primary and secondary studies in Urubici and Lages.  He studied Philosophy in Curitiba, then did his theological studies at the Pontifical Gregorian University in Rome.  He did post-graduate studies in moral theology in Rome.

Brandes was ordained priest on 6 July 1974 in Francisco Beltrão. As a priest, he exercised the following duties: Professor of Theology at the Institute of Theology of Santa Catarina; Rector of the Major Seminary in Florianópolis; Preacher of Spiritual Retreats; Director of the Institute of Theology of Santa Catarina; Member of the Ecclesiastical Court of Florianópolis; lecturer and preacher of missions.

Bishop and archbishop
On 9 March 1994, Pope John Paul II appointed Brandes Bishop of Joinville. He received his episcopal ordination there on 5 June 1994 from Bishops João Oneres Marchiori, Eusebio Oscar Scheid, SCI and Gregório Warmeling. He was secretary of the south region of the National Conference of Bishops of Brazil.

On 10 May 2006, Pope Benedict XVI appointed Brandes as Archbishop of Londrina. where he was installed on 23 July.

On 16 November 2016, Pope Francis appointed him Archbishop of Aparecida. He was installed as Archbishop of Aparecida on 21 January 2017. On October 12, 2019, during the Amazon Synod, he drew national attention for giving a sermon in Aparecida in a Morning Mass condemning what he saw as a "violent" and "unjust" right wing ideology, a "dragon of traditionialism" which he saw as "firing on the Pope [Francis], on the [Amazon] Synod, and the Second Vatican Council" a few hours later, the President of Brazil Jair Bolsonaro, known for being Political right, went to Mass in the National Shrine of Aparecida at 4 pm and read the biblical text as Reader.

References

External links
 

1944 births
21st-century Roman Catholic archbishops in Brazil
People from Santa Catarina (state)
Pontifical Gregorian University alumni
Living people
Roman Catholic archbishops of Aparecida
Roman Catholic archbishops of Londrina
Roman Catholic bishops of Joinville
Brazilian Roman Catholic archbishops